In mountaineering and climbing, a first ascent (abbreviated to FA in guide books), is the first successful documented climb to the top of a mountain or the top of a particular climbing route.  Early 20th-century mountaineers and climbers were focused on reaching the tops of iconic mountains (e.g. the eight-thousanders) and climbing routes (e.g. the great north faces of the Alps) by whatever means possible, often using considerable amounts of aid climbing, or with large expedition style support teams that laid "siege" to the climb. 

As all the key tops were summited, the manner in which the top was reached became important, particularly the ability to complete the ascent without artificial aid, which is called free climbing. In free climbing, the term first free ascent (abbreviated FFA) is used where a mountain or climbing route was ascended without any artificial aid (devices for protection in the event of a fall could be used as long as they did not aid progression).  Completing the FFA of a climbing route is often called freeing (or more latterly sending) a route.

Related terms

Mountaineering

As mountaineering developed in the 20th century, the attainment of a summit by almost any means was replaced by ascents that reflected the style used and the conditions faced.  In 2008, the most prestigious annual prize in mountaineering, the Piolet d'Or, amended its focus to small light-weight alpine-style teams using no form of aid or support, rather than on large expedition-style teams using "siege" techniques.

The most notable types of mountaineering first ascents that are chronicled are:

 First ascent.  The most notable first ascents started with the golden age of alpinism when the main alpine peaks were summited (and often using aid climbing).  In the 1930s, the focus moved to the first ascents of the great north faces of the Alps, and the Eiger in particular.  The 1950s saw the first ascents of most of the fourteen eight-thousanders, and Everest in particular.  By the 1980s, the rock spires of Trango Towers in the Karakorum, and Torres del Paine in Patagonia also had first ascents.

 First winter ascent.  The winter climbing season is between December 21 and March 20.  The first winter ascents of the great north faces of the Alps were a coveted prize, particularly the "Trilogy" of the three hardest, the Eiger, the Matterhorn, and the Grandes Jorasses.  The most notable first winter ascents were the Himalayan eight-thousanders, where the hardest, K2, was only summited in winter in 2021 (66 years after its first ascent) and considered a "holy grail" of mountaineering prizes. 

 First alpine-style (or unsupported) ascent.  In 2008, the charter of the prestigious Piolet d'Or prize was amended to focus on small teams with no support making fast, but riskier, ascents on routes that had previously been done by expeditions.  Multiple Piolet d'Or winners, whose ascents embodied this style, included Marko Prezelj, Mick Fowler, and Ueli Steck.  The charter was amended to de-incentivize excessive risk-taking after the notable deaths of several prize winners, including David Lama, and Hansjörg Auer.

 First solo ascent.  The most dangerous form of alpine-style ascent is the solo climbing ascent, performed by a single climber.  The first solo ascents of the alpine north faces, including the first solo winter ascents, were coveted (the winter solo "Trilogy" was completed by Ivano Ghirardini in 1977–78); one of the most famous practitioners was the Italian Walter Bonatti. Himalayan solo ascents are also coveted, although problems around verification are more frequent due to the more remote nature of the routes, with notable disputes such as Tomo Česen's first solo ascent of the south face of Lhotse.

Rock climbing

In rock climbing, the manner in which the first free ascent was achieved became important to chronicle by climbing journals and magazines.  The key differentiators were the style on which the route was free climbed (e.g. traditional climbing, sport climbing, or free solo climbing), whether the free climb was done on the first attempt (e.g. onsighted), and whether the climber had prior information, or beta).

The most notable types of rock climbing first ascents that are chronicled are:

 First free ascent (traditional climbing only). Pre-1980s, the FFAs were by traditional climbing techniques. A distinction was recorded if a climber practiced the moves on a top rope, called "headpointing", although with the post-1980s dominance of "redpointing" as the definition of an FFA, such a distinction was dropped. FFAs that set new grade milestones are notable, for both male and female climbers.

 First greenpoint ascent (traditional climbing only).  In the 2010s, traditional climbers used greenpointing (as a counterpoint to a "redpoint"), to describe climbing a pre-bolted sport climbing route, but only using "traditional protection" (i.e. protection that is not permanently fixed via pre-placed bolts or pitons). Sonnie Trotter's greenpoint of The Path (5.14a R, 2007), is a notable example.

 First redpoint ascent (sport climbing only).  In the 1980s, climbers wanted to ascend routes that had no opportunities for traditional climbing protection, and they had to be pre-bolted with protection (but not aid), which was called sport climbing.  The greatest progression in grade milestones was now in sport climbing. The "redpoint" became the accepted definition for what determined a "first free ascent" in sport climbing. 

 First repeat ascent (traditional or sport climbing).  The grading of a route can be complicated as the person making the FFA had no prior information or beta.  The first repeat is therefore chronicled for confirmation of a grade, particularly when a new grade milestone is proposed. For the highest grades, the first repeat can take years (e.g. Action Directe or Jumbo Love), or even decades (e.g. ).

 First onsight ascent (traditional or sport climbing).  An FFA that was onsighted, means it was done at the very first attempt, and without prior information (or beta).  Climbing journals chronicle the progression of grade milestones of onsights both male and female climbers.  

 First flash ascent (traditional or sport climbing). An FFA that was flashed, means it was done at the first attempt, but with prior information (or beta). Climbing journals chronicle the progression of grade milestones for flashed routes by male and female climbers. With the availability of route beta online (e.g. videos of prior ascents), the distinction between onsight and flash ascents has diminished.

 First free solo ascent (independent of traditional or sport climbing).  Free soloing is practiced by a smaller community of climbers and is a controversial area given the risks undertaken and whether such risks should be recorded and thus implicitly endorsed.  Free solo climbing grade milestones are chronicled, the most notable being Free Solo, the Oscar-winning film of Alex Honnold's first free solo ascent of Freerider in Yosemite.

Gender

 First female free ascent (abbreviated FFFA).  Important female climbers emerged in the 1980s including Lynn Hill and Catherine Destivelle, and climbing journals began to chronicle milestones in  female first free ascents. In some cases, an FFFA is also an FFA, and arguably the most famous example being Lynn Hill's 1993 FFA/FFFA of the 3,000-foot Nose on El Capitan (5.14a/b), considered the biggest prize in big wall climbing, announced by Hill to the world's climbing media by: "It goes, boys".  By the 2000s, Josune Bereziartu, Angela Eiter and Ashima Shiraishi, closed the gap to the highest sport climbing grades achieved by men to within one/two notches, while Beth Rodden had fully closed the gap for traditional climbing.

Notable disputes

There have been notable disputes over claims of a first ascent (or first free ascent), for various reasons (disputes over the style employed, issues with verifiability, accusations of bad faith and fraud), and the most notable are where a new grade milestone and/or major advancement in difficulty is being proposed:

Mountaineering

 First ascent of Everest: Arguably the most famous case of an unverified first ascent is whether George Mallory and/or Andrew Irvine reached the summit of Everest on the 1924 Everest expedition.  Subsequent Everest expeditions have not been able to answer the question including the 1999 Mallory and Irvine Research Expedition, and the 2007 Altitude Everest expedition.

 First ascent of Cerro Torre: In 1959, Cesare Maestri claimed he and  summited, but that Egger who had the camera, was swept to his death by an avalanche on the descent. Lionel Terry called it "the greatest climbing feat of all time". Inconsistencies in Maestri's account, and the lack of equipment on the route, led most to doubt his claim.  Maestri further inflamed the controversy by returning in 1970 and drilling 400 bolts onto his new Compressor Route, to claim the second ascent. In 2012, yet more controversy followed when American climbers Hayden Kenndey and Jason Kruk, removed Maestri's bolts, enabling David Lama and Peter Ortner to make the FFA, for which all four won a 2013 Piolet d'Or.

Rock climbing

Rouhling faced an unprecedented level of personal vilification from parts of the climbing community on whether he had actually climbed the route, as all other attempts had failed.

As with Fred Rouhling on Akira, his claim provoked a significant backlash from parts of the climbing community, and accusations that he did not actually complete an FFA (the person who belayed him could not be identified to help verification). The route was repeated in 2011 by Adam Ondra who downgraded it, and further repeats reduced its grade to circa .

See also
List of first ascents in the Alps
First ascent of the Matterhorn
List of first ascents of mountain summits
List of first ascents of eight-thousander mountains
List of grade milestones in rock climbing

Notes

References

External links
 Peter Mortimer's film First Ascent on Didier Berthod's failed first free ascent of Cobra Crack, Alpinist (Issue 17, 2006)

Climbing
Mountaineering